Berkeley is an unincorporated community in Berkeley County, West Virginia, United States. The community began as Berkeley Station on the Baltimore and Ohio Railroad line, but its name has since been shortened to Berkeley as it has become more of a bedroom community.

The community most likely takes its name from Berkeley County.

References

Unincorporated communities in Berkeley County, West Virginia
Unincorporated communities in West Virginia